Queen Anne's Walk (formerly The Mercantile Exchange) is a grade I listed building in the town of Barnstaple, North Devon, completed in 1713 as a meeting place for the town's merchants. It is believed to have been designed by the architect William Talman, on the basis of its similarity to his work at the Hall in Drayton, Northamptonshire. It was promoted and financed by the thirteen members of the Corporation of Barnstaple whose armorials are sculpted on and above the parapet, and the work was overseen by Robert Incledon (1676–1758), Mayor of Barnstaple in 1712–13. It has been owned for many decades by North Devon District Council, which currently (2014) leases it to Barnstaple Town Council, and now trades as The Cafe on the Strand.

Location and function
The building is situated at the bottom of Cross Street on the bank of the River Taw, and looked onto Barnstaple Quay, ("New Quay" after the 1870s), (now filled in) at which most of the sea-trade of the formerly important  port of Barnstaple would arrive and depart. Here cargoes shipped from around the world, including notably tobacco from the North American colonies, would arrive and be sold to awaiting Barnstaple merchants, who were accustomed to seal deals by touching the 17th century so-called Tome Stone, a low stone circular bargaining table, with inscriptions around the rim of the names of three leading merchants, including Delbridge. In 1909 the Tome stone was moved to beneath the colonnade.

Description
It consists of a low single-storey building fronted by a white Beer stone colonnade of ten bays, five to the left of the central bay supporting a statue of Queen Anne and four to the right. Above the columns and wrapping around the east side by one bay, is a parapet decorated with relief sculpted garlanded heraldic escutcheons, one per bay, showing the arms of eleven leading aristocratic, gentry and mercantile families of North Devon, with the arms of the Borough of Barnstaple forming a twelfth.

Construction

Supervision
It was completed in 1713 under the supervision of Robert Incledon (1676-1758), who in 1746 built Pilton House adjoining Barnstaple,  a lawyer of New Inn, London, a Clerk of the Peace for Devon, Deputy Recorder of Barnstaple and twice Mayor of Barnstaple, in 1712 and 1721.  In 1713 as mayor he supervised the building of the Mercantile Exchange as is recorded on the east parapet of the building by a contemporary brass plaque inscribed in Latin as follows:
Faciendum curavit Robertus Incledon Generosus Oppidi Praefectus Anno Christi MDCCXIII ("Robert Incledon, Esquire, Prefect (i.e. Mayor) of this town, supervised the making. 1713")
Above is a sculpted escutcheon with his armorials: Argent, a chevron engrailed between three tuns sable fire issuing from the bung hole proper. (The ancient building known as the "Three Tuns Inn" on the west side of Barnstaple High Street is in 2015 now the Pizza Express restaurant). Above is a plumed helm placed on a fasces, part of an antique trophy of arms. He was the younger brother of Henry Incledon (1671-1736) of Buckland House, Braunton, whose arms are shown on the front (south) parapet, a son-in-law of the merchant John Davie (d.1710), whose arms are also shown on the front parapet. Robert's first wife was Mary Lethbridge (d.1709), daughter of Christopher Lethbridge (d.1713) of Westaway House, Pilton, (whose "big and sumptuous" mural monument survives in Pilton Church,) whose arms are also shown on the front (south) parapet.

Financing
It was financed by the Corporation of Barnstaple, as the surviving contemporary inscribed brass tablet beneath the sculpted arms of that corporation records: 
"Haec porticus corporis politici de Barum sumptibus restaurata est. Opus tam decorum & utile munificentia promoverunt idemq(ue) suis insigniis ornarunt viri ipsi ornatissimi & honorabiles" ("This colonnade was re-erected by the expense of the body politic (i.e. corporation) of Barnstaple. By their munificence men themselves honourable and most illustrious promoted this work so decorous and useful and decorated the same with their insignia")

Queen Anne's statue

In 1708 Robert Rolle (c. 1677–1710) of Stevenstone, near Great Torrington in Devon,  donated to the Corporation of Barnstaple, Devon, a large stone statue of Queen Anne, the victorious monarch of the recent Battle of Blenheim in 1704. He was a Tory MP for Callington  (twice in 1701)  (a pocket borough of the Rolle family) and for Devon (1702–1710). Underneath the statue, possibly intended to be free-standing and not on top of this building, is its original base, now seated somewhat incongruously above the Royal Arms. On the base is an escutcheon showing a cartouche with the arms of Rolle (Or, on a fesse dancetté between three billets azure each charged with a lion rampant of the first three bezants), now much worn, above which is the Rolle crest: A cubit arm erect vested or charged with a fess indented cotised azure in the hand a roll of parchment. On either side of the Rolle arms is a seated naked, disheveled and shackled French prisoner of war, behind whom is a centrally placed antique trophy of arms consisting of captured French weapons (two canon, muskets, a club, a halberd and a helmet etc.) and two lowered French standards on either side. The imagery is reminiscent of the sculptures of two French captives atop the central pediment of Blenheim Palace, built for the Duke of Marlborough, the victorious English commander at that battle. The original source for both is imagery from the classical world, as visible for example on Roman coins. On each side of the base of the statue of Queen Anne is an escutcheon showing the arms of Rolle impaling Duke, the arms of his wife. Immediately below the feet of the Queen is a tablet on which is inscribed the following Latin text: 
"Anna, Intemeratae fidei testimonium Roberti Rolle de Stephenstone in agro Devoniensi Armigeri MDCCVIII" ("Anne, a testament of the undefiled faith of Robert Rolle, Esquire, of Stevenstone in the land of Devonshire, 1708")
The inscription was transcribed by the Devon topographer Rev. John Swete (d. 1821) in his "Journals". On the sides of the base of the statue are identical heraldic escutcheons showing the arms of Robert Rolle impaling the arms of Duke, Per fesse argent and azure, three chaplets counterchanged, for his wife Elizabeth Duke (d. 1716), daughter of Richard Duke (1652–1733), MP, of Otterton, Devon.

Chronology
The  building was first mentioned in 1609 when a walking place for merchants was erected on the quay. It was then known as the Mercantile Exchange or Merchants' Walk. In about  1708, the present colonnade known as "Queen Anne's Walk"  was constructed. In 1859-60 baths were built at which time according to Blaylock (1986), the whole structure was dismantled and the facade rebuilt integrally with the whole. There were six "private baths for ladies and gentlemen" and a "wash house for the poor". In 1866 the "small quay" nearby was filled in following complaints about the "stink from the mud", and on the site was later built the surviving Strand bus station, in the style of Queen Anne's Walk.

In 1868 it was converted to a Masonic Hall. In 1872 the North Devon railway was  extended northwards to Ilfracombe and southwards to Torrington, and the new "town station" at Barnstaple destroyed the old harbour area in front of Queen Anne's Walk, following which replacement quays were built at Castle Quay. Repairs were carried out in 1985 when a survey and detailed drawings of the building were made by Blaylock.<ref>Timms, S., 20/06/1984, Queen Annes Walk (Personal Comment): "The District Council proposes to repair the stonework on the façade in 1984/5 with the aid of a grant from the Historic Buildings and Monuments Commission".(Quoted by Heritage Gateway)</ref>  Further repairs were undertaken in 1912 and 1923. It was re-roofed in 1981. In 1986 a survey was made by  Exeter Museums Archaeological Field Unit.

Armorials

 
The armorial bearings on the structure are illustrated and described in Blaylock's 1985 survey. As the contemporary brass tablet affixed to the east parapet suggests, they represent the members of the Corporation of Barnstaple, viri ipsi ornatissimi & honorabiles, "men themselves honourable and most illustrious", who financed the building work. Nine of them are members of a tightly-knit group closely related by blood or marriage, namely: Acland, Hooper, Basset, Davie, Clevland, Chichester, both Incledons and Lethbridge (see pedigree chart illustration). In 1913 the arms shown on the entablature were repeated on twelve small escutcheons and crests in coloured enamels on small decorative brass plates stamped "PARTRIDGE 1913" made by May Hart Partridge (born c.1881 in Harborne, Staffordshire – died 1917), an art enameller who studied at the Birmingham School of Art. She was "the most notorious pupil of Arthur Gaskin". Her works are mainly in the Arts and Crafts style. She later worked at London County Council schools and at home.Mapping the Practice and Profession of Sculpture in Britain and Ireland 1851-1951, University of Glasgow History of Art and HATII, online database 2011, Frederick James Partridge

May Hart Partridge was the wife of Frederick James Partridge (c.1877–1946), born in Barnstaple, a jeweller, silversmith and  teacher of jewellery making. These  are now displayed in individual glazed wooden frames affixed to the walls of the staircase of the Barnstaple Guildhall, six on each side. The families so represented are, in order of escutcheons on parapet from west to east (left to right when looking at main front):Gules a Castle of three towers conjoined Argent the centre tower larger than the others. Barnstaple Borough. Raised above parapet on south corner of east parapet. Inscribed brass tablet below. Argent, a chevron engrailed between three tuns sable fire issuing from the bung hole proper''. Incledon, for Robert Incledon (1676-1758), Mayor of Barnstaple 1712-13, who supervised the construction. Escutcheon raised above parapet at north (left) corner of east side. Inscribed brass tablet below. The arms of his elder brother Henry Incledon (1671-1736) of Buckland House, Braunton, are shown on the south side of the parapet. The ancient building known as the "Three Tuns" survives on the west side of the high Street.

Further reading
Lamplugh, Lois, Barnstaple: Town on the Taw,  South Molton, 2002, p. 56

Sources
Heritage Gateway, Devon & Dartmoor, MDV841: Queen Anne's Walk, Barnstaple
Pevsner, Nikolaus & Cherry, Bridget, The Buildings of England: Devon, London, 2004, p. 153
Blaylock, S. R., 1986, Queen Anne's Walk, Barnstaple (Report & Survey)
Gribble, Joseph Besly, Memorials of Barnstaple: Being an Attempt to Supply the Want of A History of that Ancient Borough, Barnstaple, 1830, pp.560-1 (Gribble established the “Barnstaple Iron Foundry” in 1822 (p. 546))

References

Grade I listed buildings in Devon
Barnstaple